Hawaiioscia rapui is a species of woodlouse endemic to the island of Rapa Nui. The specific epithet honors Sergio Rapu Haoa, a humanitarian, archaeologist, anthropologist, and politician of Rapanui descent who aided research terms studying this species. It persists as a relict population near the mouths of caves on the island, and is in dire need of conservation. It faces threats such as habitat reduction, non-native species competition, and global climate change.  Styloniscus manuvaka is the only other native Isopod on the island, and faces the same perils.

References

Woodlice
Fauna of Easter Island